The Men's 20 km Race Walking event at the 2007 Pan American Games took place on July 22, 2007 in the Parque do Flamengo in Rio de Janeiro. Ecuador's Jefferson Pérez defended his title, defeating his compatriot Rolando Saquipay.

Medalists

Records

Results

See also
2007 World Championships in Athletics – Men's 20 kilometres walk
2007 Race Walking Year Ranking
Athletics at the 2008 Summer Olympics – Men's 20 kilometre walk

References
Official results

Walk, Men's 20
2007